Arthur M. Garbutt was an architect who practiced in Fort Collins, Colorado and Casper, Wyoming.  He worked from approximately 1903 to 1928.

Life and career
He practiced alone and in partnerships Fuller and Garbutt, Garbutt and Weidner and Garbutt, Weidner and Sweeney.  During 1914 to 1925, an oil boom period in Casper, Wyoming, Garbutt, Weidner and Sweeney "was the dominant architectural firm in the city,
responsible for designing 15 schools and over 50 residences and commercial buildings."

A number of his works are listed on the U.S. National Register of Historic Places, including a concentration of partnership works in Casper, Wyoming.

Architectural works
Casper Fire Department Station No. 1, 302 S. David St. Casper, WY (Garbutt, Weidner and Sweeney), NRHP-listed
Church of Saint Anthony, 604 S. Center St. Casper, WY (Garbutt, Weidner and Sweeney), NRHP-listed
Consolidated Royalty Building, 137–141 S. Center St. Casper, WY (Garbutt and Weidner), NRHP-listed
Elks Lodge No. 1353, 108 E. 7th St. Casper, WY (Garbutt, Weidner and Sweeney, et al.), NRHP-listed
Fort Collins Armory, 314 E. Mountain Ave. Fort Collins, CO (Garbutt, Arthur M.), NRHP-listed
Midwest Oil Company Hotel, 136 E. 6th St. Casper, WY (Garbutt & Weidner), NRHP-listed
Natrona County High School, 930 S. Elm St. Casper, WY (Garbutt, Arthur), NRHP-listed
Roosevelt School, 140 E. K St. Casper, WY (Garbutt, Weidner and Sweeney), NRHP-listed
Townsend Hotel, 115 N. Centre St. Casper, WY (Garbutt, Weidner & Sweeny), NRHP-listed
Tribune Building, 216 E. 2nd St. Casper, WY (Garbutt, Weidner and Sweeney), NRHP-listed

References

Architects from Colorado
Architects from Wyoming
Year of birth missing
Year of death missing